Count of Miranda do Corvo (in Portuguese Conde de Miranda do Corvo) was a Portuguese title of nobility created by a royal decree, dated from March 21, 1611, by King Philip II of Portugal, also known as Philip III of Spain, and granted to Dom Henrique de Sousa Tavares.

Henrique was 26th Lord of the House of Sousa, Lord of Miranda do Corvo and Alcaide (Mayor) of Arronches.

The Prince Regent Pedro, Duke of Beja, on behalf of King Afonso VI of Portugal, granted the new title of Marquis of Arronches (in Portuguese Marquês de Arronches) by a royal decree dated from June 27, 1674 to Henrique de Sousa Tavares, who was already 3rd Count of Miranda do Corvo.

On May 13, 1796, a royal decree issued by Queen Maria I of Portugal, upgraded the title of Count of Miranda do Corvo to Duke of Miranda do Corvo (in Portuguese Duque de Miranda do Corvo), who should be beard by the Duke of Lafões heir during his father's life.

List of the Counts of Miranda do Corvo (1611) and Marquesses of Arronches (1674)
Henrique de Sousa Tavares (c.1550– ? ), 1st Count of Miranda do Corvo; 
Diogo Lopes de Sousa (c.1595–1640), 2nd Count of Miranda do Corvo; 
Henrique de Sousa Tavares (1626–1706), 3rd Count of Miranda do Corvo and 1st Marquis of Arronches;
Diogo Lopes de Sousa (1646–1672), 4th Count of Miranda do Corvo (died before his father and that is why he was not Marquis of Arronches);
Mariana Luisa Francisca de Sousa Tavares Mascarenhas e Silva (1672–1743), 5th Countess of Miranda do Corvo and 2nd Marchioness of Arronches;
Luisa Casimira de Sousa Nassau e Ligne (1694–1729), 6th Countess of Miranda do Corvo; 
Pedro Henrique de Bragança (1718–1761), 7th Count of Miranda do Corvo, 3rd Marquis of Arronches and 1st Duke of Lafões.

(for the following Counts/Marquesses see Duke of Lafões)

See also
List of Marquesses in Portugal
List of Countships in Portugal
Duke of Lafões
Duke of Miranda do Corvo

Bibliography
”Nobreza de Portugal e do Brasil" – Vol. II, pages 322/324 and 747/748. Published by Zairol Lda., Lisbon 1989.

External links
Genealogy of the Counts of Miranda do Corvo, in Portuguese
Genealogy of the Marquesses of Arronches, in Portuguese

Miranda do Corvo
1611 establishments in Portugal